Ozkan Cetiner (born 25 November 2000) is a French professional footballer who plays as a midfielder for Belgian club Olympic Charleroi.

Professional career
On 8 June 2020, Cetiner signed a professional contract with Dunkerque. Cetiner made his professional debut with Dunkerque in a 1-0 Ligue 2 win over Valenciennes on 19 September 2020.

On 3 September 2021, he moved to Belgium and signed with the third-tier club Olympic Charleroi.

Personal life
Born in France, Cetiner is of Turkish descent.

References

External links
 

2000 births
People from Saint-Quentin, Aisne
French people of Turkish descent
Living people
French footballers
Association football midfielders
USL Dunkerque players
R. Olympic Charleroi Châtelet Farciennes players
Ligue 2 players
Championnat National 2 players
Championnat National 3 players
French expatriate footballers
Expatriate footballers in Belgium
French expatriate sportspeople in Belgium
Sportspeople from Aisne
Footballers from Hauts-de-France